AYK Radiant is an electric 1/10 scale 4WD Radio Control vehicle made by AYK and distributed by Race Prep starting in 1987. It was followed up by the Radiant Pro which went on to do very well at the National ROAR event in Michigan and the Team Losi Winter Champs in Florida in 1990. There was a Truck Conversion Kit Offered by Race Prep to convert the Pro Version of the Radiant, this kit was based on the truck that won the ROAR Monster Truck National Championships in 1990. The Radiant Pro, driven by Mike Dunn, finished 7th in the 4WD class of the 1989 IFMAR 1:10 Electric Off-Road World Championship.

Features
Features Common to Both Versions
Double wishbone Suspension Front and Rear
Chain Drive Four Wheel Drive System
Adjustable front and rear Differentials
Aero-Dynamic Racing Wheels
Adjustable Shock Mounts

Original Radiant Features
Rear Engine configuration

Radiant PRO Features
Mid Engine Configuration
One Way Roller Bearings in the Front Hubs

Versions 
 AYK Radiant - 1987
 AYK Radiant Pro - 1989

References 

1:10 radio-controlled off-road buggies